Songs by the German band Modern Talking, listed in chronological order (current through 2009). Some songs may be known by more than one title (like Brother Louie is known also as No te pertenece (Spanish language version) or Brother Tuki).

1984 - 1987 
 "You're My Heart, You're My Soul" (The 1st Album)
 "You Can Win If You Want" (The 1st Album)
 "There's Too Much Blue in Missing You" (The 1st Album)
 "Diamonds Never Made a Lady" (The 1st Album)
 "The Night is Yours - The Night is Mine" (The 1st Album)
 "Do You Wanna" (The 1st Album)
 "Lucky Guy" (The 1st Album)
 "One in a Million" (The 1st Album)
 "Bells of Paris" (The 1st Album)
 "Cheri, Cheri Lady" (Let's Talk About Love)
 "With a Little Love" (Let's Talk About Love)
 "Wild Wild Water" (Let's Talk About Love)
 "You're The Lady of My Heart" (Let's Talk About Love)
 "Just Like an Angel" (Let's Talk About Love)
 "Heaven Will Know" (Let's Talk About Love)
 "Love Don't Live Here Anymore" (Let's Talk About Love)
 "Why Did You Do It Just Tonight" (Let's Talk About Love)
 "Don't Give Up" (Let's Talk About Love)
 "Let's Talk About Love" (Let's Talk About Love)
 "Brother Louie" (Ready for Romance)
 "Just We Two (Mona Lisa)" (Ready for Romance)
 "Lady Lai" (Ready for Romance)
 "Doctor for My Heart" (Ready for Romance)
 "Save Me - Don't Break Me" (Ready for Romance)
 "Atlantis is Calling (S.O.S. for Love)" (Ready for Romance)
 "Keep Love Alive" (Ready for Romance)
 "Hey You" (Ready for Romance)
 "Angie's Heart" (Ready for Romance)
 "Only Love Can Break My Heart" (Ready for Romance)
 "Geronimo's Cadillac" (In the Middle of Nowhere)
 "Riding on a White Swan" (In the Middle of Nowhere)
 "Give Me Peace on Earth" (In the Middle of Nowhere)
 "Sweet Little Sheila" (In the Middle of Nowhere)
 "Ten Thousand Lonely Drums" (In the Middle of Nowhere)
 "Lonely Tears in Chinatown" (In the Middle of Nowhere)
 "In Shaire" (In the Middle of Nowhere)
 "Stranded in the Middle of Nowhere" (In the Middle of Nowhere)
 "The Angels Sing in New York City" (In the Middle of Nowhere)
 "Princess of the Night" (In the Middle of Nowhere)
 "Jet Airliner" (Romantic Warriors)
 "Like a Hero" (Romantic Warriors)
 "Don't Worry" (Romantic Warriors)
 "Blinded by Your Love" (Romantic Warriors)
 "Romantic Warriors" (Romantic Warriors)
 "Arabian Gold" (Romantic Warriors)
 "We Still Have Dreams" (Romantic Warriors)
 "Operator Gimme 6-0-9" (Romantic Warriors)
 "You and Me" (Romantic Warriors)
 "Charlene" (Romantic Warriors)
 "In 100 Years" (In the Garden of Venus)
 "Don't Let It Get You Down" (In the Garden of Venus)
 "Who Will Save the World" (In the Garden of Venus)
 "A Telegram to Your Heart" (In the Garden of Venus)
 "It's Christmas" (In the Garden of Venus)
 "Don't Lose My Number" (In the Garden of Venus)
 "Slow Motion" (In the Garden of Venus)
 "Locomotion Tango" (In the Garden of Venus)
 "Good Girls Go to Heaven - Bad Girls Go Everywhere" (In the Garden of Venus)

1998 - 2003 
 "I Will Follow You" (Back for Good)
 "Don't Play With My Heart" (Back for Good)
 "We Take the Chance" (Back for Good)
 "Anything is Possible" (Back for Good)
 "You Are Not Alone" (Alone)
 "Sexy, Sexy Lover" (Alone)
 "I Can't Give You More" (Alone)
 "Just Close Your Eyes" (Alone)
 "Don't Let Me Go" (Alone)
 "I'm So Much in Love" (Alone)
 "Rouge et Noir" (Alone)
 "All I Have" (Alone)
 "Can't Get Enough" (Alone)
 "Love is Like a Rainbow" (Alone)
 "How You Mend a Broken Heart" (Alone)
 "It Hurts So Good" (Alone)
 "I'll Never Give You Up" (Alone)
 "Don't Let Me Down" (Alone)
 "Taxi Girl" (Alone)
 "For Always and Ever" (Alone)
 "Space Mix '98" (Alone)
 "China in Her Eyes" (Year of the Dragon)
 "Don't Take Away My Heart" (Year of the Dragon)
 "It's Your Smile" (Year of the Dragon)
 "Cosmic Girl" (Year of the Dragon)
 "After Your Love is Gone" (Year of the Dragon)
 "Girl Out of My Dreams" (Year of the Dragon)
 "My Lonely Girl" (Year of the Dragon)
 "No Face, No Name, No Number" (Year of the Dragon)
 "Can't Let You Go" (Year of the Dragon)
 "Part Time Lover" (Year of the Dragon)
 "Time is on My Side" (Year of the Dragon)
 "I'll Never Fall in Love Again" (Year of the Dragon)
 "Avec Toi" (Year of the Dragon)
 "I'm Not Guilty" (Year of the Dragon)
 "Fight for the Right Love" (Year of the Dragon)
 "Walking in the Rain of Paris" (Year of the Dragon)
 "Fly to the Moon" (Year of the Dragon)
 "Love is Forever" (Year of the Dragon)
 "Win the Race" (America)
 "Last Exit to Brooklyn" (America)
 "Maria" (America)
 "SMS to My Heart" (America)
 "Cinderella Girl" (America)
 "Why Does it Feel So Good" (America)
 "Rain in My Heart" (America)
 "Witchqueen of Eldorado" (America)
 "Run to You" (America)
 "America" (America)
 "For a Life Time" (America)
 "From Coast to Coast" (America)
 "There's Something in the Air" (America)
 "I Need You Now" (America)
 "New York City Girl" (America)
 "Send Me a Letter from Heaven" (America)
 "Ready for the Victory" (Victory)
 "I'm Gonna Be Strong" (Victory)
 "Don't Make Me Blue" (Victory)
 "Juliet" (Victory)
 "Higher than Heaven" (Victory)
 "You're Not Lisa" (Victory)
 "When the Sky Rained Fire" (Victory)
 "Summer in December" (Victory)
 "10 Seconds to Countdown" (Victory)
 "Love to Love You" (Victory)
 "Blue Eyed Coloured Girl" (Victory)
 "We Are the Children of the World" (Victory)
 "Mrs. Robota" (Victory)
 "If I..." (Victory)
 "Who Will Love You Like I Do" (Victory)
 "TV Makes the Superstar" (Universe)
 "I'm No Rockefeller" (Universe)
 "Mystery" (Universe)
 "Everybody Needs Somebody" (Universe)
 "Heart of an Angel" (Universe)
 "Who Will Be There" (Universe)
 "Knocking on My Door" (Universe)
 "Should I, Would I, Could I" (Universe)
 "Blackbird" (Universe)
 "Life is Too Short" (Universe)
 "Nothing But the Truth" (Universe)
 "Superstar" (Universe)

Lost songs 
 "Cryin' in the Night" (Thomas Anders/Modern Talking Fan Club CD)
 "If I Can't Have You" (Thomas Anders/Modern Talking Fan Club CD)
 "Cry for You" (Thomas Anders/Modern Talking Fan Club CD)
 "Down on My Knees" (Juliet - single)
 "Shooting Star" (Dieter - Der Film)
 "Deeper" (demo)
 "My Declaration of Love" (demo)
 "Christmas Lubally" (demo)

 
Modern Talking